Rachel and the Stranger is a 1948 American Western film starring Loretta Young, William Holden, and Robert Mitchum. The Norman Foster-directed film was one of the few to address the role of women in the pioneer west, as well as portray early America's indentured servant trade. It was based on the Howard Fast short story "Rachel".

While the film had a low budget, it was RKO's most successful film that year, making $395,000.

Plot
In colonial America, David Harvey (William Holden), a recent widower farming in the wilderness, decides that his young boy Davey (Gary Gray) needs a woman around to help raise him. The following spring, he goes to the nearest settlement and consults Parson Jackson (Tom Tully) and his wife. In view of the dearth of women in the settlement, David is persuaded to buy the contract of an indentured servant named Rachel (Loretta Young). David accepts that he will have to marry her, for the sake of propriety.

Their marriage, however, is in name only. David is still grieving for his dead wife Susan and Davey resents what he sees as an attempt to replace his mother. Despite her hopes, Rachel is treated as a servant and not a wife. She is naturally upset by this but keeps her sorrows to herself. Unlike Susan, she is unskilled in the use of a musket, but resolves to learn to shoot to connect with the boy and through him, with the father. She practices secretly in the cabin's cellar. This will stand her in good stead later.

Jim Fairways (Robert Mitchum), a hunter who is a family friend (and former suitor of Susan's), visits and becomes attracted to Rachel. She blossoms under Jim's attentions and discloses, to David's surprise and embarrassment, that she can play Susan's spinet. They enjoy a pleasant evening of instrumental music and singing. Later, Davey interrupts the beginnings of a mutual understanding between David and Rachel.

On his next visit, ostensibly to retrieve his forgotten guitar, Jim brings presents, including a dress for Rachel. David is disturbed by the easy way in which Jim has become friendly with Rachel and he slowly becomes jealous and irritated as Jim stays weeks longer than expected. He takes the opportunity of a night out hunting foxes with the dogs, to tackle Jim and encourage him to leave. Davey defies Rachel and stays outside the cabin to listen to the sounds of the hunt. A prowling mountain lion threatens Davey and the stock. At the sound of a gunshot the men come running and Rachel admits that she killed the animal. As a result, she rises in Davey's estimation.

When Jim offers to buy her, David's resentments come to the surface and they fight. Rachel has to intervene. She is quietly furious and feels that both men appear to regard her more as a commodity to be traded than as a wife. She decides to leave and walks back to the settlement, daring David to take her to law over the indenture. David is angry but also concerned about her traveling alone in view of the possible presence of Shawnee nearby. It has slowly dawned on him what a fine woman she is and what her loss would mean to him. Jim intends to press his own suit. Taking Davey, they ride after her.

That night, while they are camped, Jim makes an offer to Rachel to come away with him. At Davey's urging, David makes an awkward bid for her to return home. She does not respond to either man. Later, they see a glow in the night sky and fear the Shawnee are attacking settlers. The two men send Rachel and Davey on horseback to the settlement for safety while they run back to the cabin to see what is going on.

Rachel is worried about David and after a while sends Davey on for help while she follows the men. She reaches the cabin to find them besieged. She is dragged from her horse by one of the attackers, but David and Jim make a sally and manage to get her into the cabin where she uses her new-found skill with a musket to aid the defense. The Shawnee set the cabin on fire and the trio retreat to the cellar. Early next morning, Parson Jackson and the local militia arrive to drive off the attackers. David and Rachel survey the burnt-out cabin, making tentative plans for the future. Rachel knows she has been accepted as a wife when David tells his son to "do as your Ma says" and enfolds her in a tender embrace.

Cast
 Loretta Young as Rachel Harvey
 William Holden as David Harvey
 Robert Mitchum as Jim Fairways
 Gary Gray as Davey
 Tom Tully as Parson Jackson
 Sara Haden as Mrs. Jackson
 Frank Ferguson as Mr. Green
 Walter Baldwin as Gallus
 Regina Wallace as Mrs. Green

Production
Filming took place in Eugene, Oregon.

Reception
The film recorded a profit of $395,000.

After Mitchum was arrested for possessing marijuana, RKO rushed to release the film to take advantage of the news of Mitchum's arrest.

References

External links
 
 
 
 
 

1948 films
1948 Western (genre) films
1948 drama films
American Western (genre) films
American black-and-white films
1940s English-language films
Films based on short fiction
Films directed by Norman Foster
Films scored by Roy Webb
Films set in Ohio
Films set in the 18th century
Films shot in Eugene, Oregon
Films with screenplays by Waldo Salt
RKO Pictures films
Revisionist Western (genre) films
1940s American films